Peter Reginald Wallace Harrison (born 22 June 1939) was Archdeacon of the East Riding from 1999 until 2006.

He was educated at Charterhouse, Selwyn College Cambridge and Ridley Hall Cambridge; and  ordained in 1965. After a curacy in Barton Hill, he was involved in Youth Work within the Church of England. He was in London from 1969 to 1977 and then at Mirfield from 1977 to 1984. After this, he was Team Rector of the Drypool Ministry, a post he held until 1999.

References

1939 births
People educated at Charterhouse School
Alumni of Selwyn College, Cambridge
Archdeacons of the East Riding
Alumni of Ridley Hall, Cambridge
Living people